Sahayal is a rural-based town in Auraiya district in the state of Uttar Pradesh, India.

The nearest railway station to the town is Phaphund railway station, on the Kanpur–Delhi section of Howrah–Delhi mainline and Howrah–Gaya–Delhi line operated by North Central Railway. The district administrative headquarters of the town is Auraiya. Sahayal is known for a raw fruit used in the making of Petha, a popular Indian sweet.

Geography
Sahaval is situated near Dibiyapur, a famous industrial city, and Kanpur, the largest city in the state of Uttar Pradesh. Rasulabad is around 18 km east.

The Rind river (also Arind, which shares its name with another river further northwest) borders the southwest region of the town.

Climate

Sahayal features an atypical version of the humid subtropical climate. Summers are long, and the weather is extremely hot from early April to mid-October, with the monsoon season in between. Average annual rainfall is about 792 mm. About 85% of the normal rainfall in the town is received during the southwest monsoon months from June to September. August is the rainiest month. The brief, mild winter starts in late November, peaks in January, often accompanied by heavy fog.

May is the hottest and January the coolest. During the rainy season, relative humidity is generally over 70%. Post monsoons, the humidity decreases, and in summer, the driest season, the relative humidity reaches below 30%.

Transport

Sahayal is mainly connected to nearby cities and towns by roads. It has no direct access to the railway station. This station is in the Kanpur-Phaphund-Tundla Sub-section.

The nearest airport is the Chakeri Airport located in Kanpur,  from Sahayal.

Education

Sahayal mostly has state-affiliated schools and colleges. Proper schooling facilities are limited. Some of the schools located in the town are:
 Government Pre-primary School
 Government Primary School
 Government Composite Junior High School, Mandhawan
 Swatantra Bharat Inter College
 Chacha Murlidhar Residential School
 Shyam Sakhi Smarak Vidyalaya Inter College
Jawahar Navodaya Vidyalaya, Tarapur

Healthcare

Sahayal lacks proper health care facilities. People must travel to nearby cities Dibiyapur or Kanpur for treatment.

Although Sahayal has a primary health care centre, it lacks proper management and treatment. No pathologists or sample collection centres are available. Available health care centres are:
 Primary Health care centre
 Primary Health Sub-Centre
 Veterinary Hospitals are available in this village.

Administration

Sayahal has its own Gram Panchayat, headed by Gram Pradhan. The Gram Panchayat comes under the Block Panchayat Samiti that is located in Sahar.

Sayahal has its own police station

Economy

The main export is agricultural and dairy products. The town has many shops and businesses.

Agriculture

Wheat, maize, bajra, paddy, and vegetables are some of the many agricultural products grown in the Sahayal. The irrigated area of the village is 791.13 hectares, and from it, boreholes/tube wells occupy 189.89 hectares. Lakes (or tanks) occupy 601.24 hectares and they both are common sources of irrigation.

Drinking water and sanitation

Tap water is available 24/7. A municipal hand pump is another source of potable water. A drainage system is available. Drain water is discharged into the sewer system. Municipal garbage collection is provided.

Demographics

References 

Auraiya district
Dibiyapur
Kanpur